Joe Cullen (born 13 July 1989) is an English professional darts player who plays in Professional Darts Corporation (PDC) events. He won three Youth Tour tournaments in his early career and has qualified for the PDC World Championship twelve times, winning only thrice in the first round. Cullen reached his first major quarter-final at the 2016 UK Open and won his first PDC Pro Tour title in 2017. He won his first televised title at the 2022 Masters.

Career

Early career
Cullen first came to prominence in 2008 when he qualified for the UK Open. He defeated Mark Stapleton and Dennis Smith before Chris Mason defeated him in the last 64. Following his performances at Bolton, he joined the PDC circuit. He also reached the final of the New Kids on the Oche tournament, losing to Arron Monk.

In 2009, Cullen decided to leave his job as a postman to concentrate on a career in darts.

Cullen had another decent run at the 2010 UK Open. He knocked out Darren Latham and Mike Nott before losing to Mervyn King, again in the last 64. Later that year, he defeated Phil Taylor in the last 16 of the John McEvoy Gold Dart Classic in Killarney, eventually losing in the quarter-finals to Colin Osborne.

Cullen qualified for his first PDC World Darts Championship in 2011. He lost narrowly to Terry Jenkins by 3 sets to 2 in the first round. In April, Cullen reached his first PDC Pro Tour final at the sixth UK Open Qualifier in Barnsley, losing 6–1 to Taylor.

2012
He reached the final of the PDPA World Championship Qualifier, where he was beaten 5–3 by Arron Monk. The result meant that he qualified for the preliminary round of the 2012 World Championship, where he beat Oliver Ferenc of Serbia by 4 legs to 2. He played number 10 seed Terry Jenkins in the first round for the second successive year and was beaten 3–0, winning just three legs in the match. In April, he earned a place in the Austrian Darts Open by defeating Sam Hill and John Bowles in the UK qualifier. He played Brendan Dolan in the first round and won 6–4, and then continued his run by beating Simon Whitlock 6–4, despite his opponent hitting a nine darter. Cullen defeated Mark Walsh to make the quarter-finals, where he was this time on the wrong end of a 6–4 scoreline as he lost to eventual winner Justin Pipe. Cullen's best result of the season came a week after this as he won through to the semi-finals of the final UK Open Qualifier, but was then whitewashed 6–0 by Pipe. He also qualified for the third European Tour event, the European Darts Open and beat Jenkins 6–1 in the first round in Düsseldorf, before losing to Johnny Haines 6–5 in round two.

Cullen reached the last 16 of the UK Open with victories over Jim Walker (9–4) and Colin Lloyd (9–8), but then let a 4–0 and 5–1 lead against Jamie Caven slip to lose 9–8. He qualified for the World Matchplay for the first time and lost to Pipe 10–4 in the first round.

2013
Cullen qualified for the 2013 World Championship by finishing 36th on the 2012 ProTour Order of Merit, claiming the fifth of sixteen spots that were available for the highest non-qualified players. He lost 3–0 to John Part in the first round, with the Canadian's superior finishing being the difference between the players. Cullen was ranked world number 41 after the tournament. He lost 9–5 to Lee Palfreyman in the third round of the UK Open. At the Austrian Darts Open Cullen beat Kim Huybrechts 6–4 and then averaged a stunning 111.84 average in seeing off Stuart Kellett 6–1. He reached the quarter-finals of this event for the second year running by surviving one match dart from Raymond van Barneveld to win 6–5, but was then beaten 6–0 by Mervyn King. Cullen reached three other quarter-finals in floor events during the year but lost in each one.

2014
Cullen qualified for the 2014 World Championship through the ProTour Order of Merit once again and faced Peter Wright in the first round. Cullen took out a 147 finish to level the opening set with Wright on 12 but lost the decider and also lost the final leg in the second set and was beaten 3–0. He missed out on playing in the UK Open for the first time in his career as he failed to advance beyond the last 128 in any of the six qualifiers. At the 11th Players Championship of the year he reached the semi-finals of a ranking PDC event for the first in over two years, where he was defeated 6–3 by Gary Anderson. Cullen won through to the same stage of the 16th event with impressive victories over Dave Chisnall, Andy Hamilton and Michael van Gerwen, but this time lost 6–3 to Brendan Dolan.

2015
Cullen lost 3–1 to reigning champion Michael van Gerwen in the first round of the 2015 World Championship, after every set had gone to a deciding leg which included Cullen missing two darts for the second set. He was knocked out in the third round of the UK Open 9–6 by Eddie Dootson. Cullen lost in the quarter-finals of the first Players Championship 6–0 to Dave Chisnall and had to wait until October for another one. It came at the European Darts Grand Prix after he saw off Antonio Alcinas 6–3, Chisnall 6–2 (with an average of 103.58) and then averaged an outstanding 110.16 in defeating Raymond van Barneveld 6–2. However, in the quarters he averaged just over 20 points less during a 6–4 loss to Mensur Suljović. Cullen's third and final quarter-final of 2015 was at the 19th Players Championship after he ousted Ronnie Baxter, Ian White, Jamie Caven and Steve West, before losing 6–4 to Stephen Bunting.

2016
He took the final qualifying spot from the Pro Tour Order of Merit for the 2016 World Championship, but lost in the opening round for the sixth year in a row as he won just two legs during a 3–0 defeat to Jelle Klaasen. At the UK Open Cullen beat Mark Frost 9–1, Alan Norris 9–6 and Stephen Bunting 9–7 to play in his first major quarter-final. He produced a fightback from 9–3 down to Peter Wright, but would lose 10–7 with an average of 101.83, his highest in a televised match to date. This began a rich vein in form for Cullen as he reached the semi-finals of the first Players Championship event (lost 6–3 to Wright) and the same stage of the German Darts Masters (lost 6–1 to Michael van Gerwen after whitewashing reigning world champion Gary Anderson 6–0 in the quarters).

Cullen's second ever PDC final came at the ninth Players Championship, but he was thrashed 6–0 by Benito van de Pas. Another came at the 11th event and he was left waiting for his first professional title as Ian White won 6–3. Cullen qualified for the World Matchplay for the first time in four years and lost 10–5 to Wright in the opening round. Cullen made his debut at the World Grand Prix and he won the first set against Simon Whitlock, before losing six of the next seven legs to bow out. After seeing off Chris Dobey 6–2 at the European Championship he was heavily beaten 10–3 by Phil Taylor in the second round. A 13 dart leg from Cullen saw him squeeze past Anderson in to the quarter-finals of the non-ranking World Series of Darts Finals, where he lost to Wright in a televised match for the third time in 2016, this time 10–7. Cullen eased past Steve Brown 6–1 and Rowby-John Rodriguez 6–0 at the Players Championship Finals, but then averaged 71.13 as Raymond van Barneveld knocked him out 10–2 in the third round.

2017
After breaking into the top 32 on the Order of Merit during 2016, it meant Cullen was a seeded player at the World Championship for the first time in his career. He beat Corey Cadby 3–1 in the first round to pick up his first-ever win at the tournament at the seventh time of asking. Cullen averaged 100.88, but went on to lose 4–0 to two-time winner of the event Adrian Lewis in the next round.

Cullen joined the Professional Dart Players Association's 9 Dart Club for the first time, after getting a nine-dart finish in the second round of the 2017 PDC Players Championship 4 against Jim Brown.

Cullen claimed his first PDC title in April at the eighth Players Championship. He was 4–1 up in the final, before Daryl Gurney squared the match at 5–5. Gurney missed one match dart and Cullen won on double four and said afterwards that he had relied on his natural talent in the past, but in the last year he had also been working very hard on his game.

2022

Entering the 2022 PDC World Darts Championship ranked 13th in the world, Cullen defeated Jim Williams 3–2 in the second round before losing 3–4 to debutant Martijn Kleermaker in the third round. On 30 January 2022, Cullen won a first televised PDC title when he won the 2022 Masters. Cullen defeated Daryl Gurney, Gary Anderson 10–1 with an average of 106.30, Michael van Gerwen and José de Sousa en route to the final. Despite missing ten match darts, he defeated Dave Chisnall 11–9 to secure his first televised PDC title.

Cullen joined the Professional Dart Players Association's 9 Dart Club for the second time, after getting a nine-dart finish in the third round of the 2022 PDC Players Championship 5 against James Wilson.

Cullen competed in his debut season in the Premier League in 2022; he finished 4th in the table and qualified for finals night on the last night of league play, by defeating Peter Wright in his final match. On June 13, at finals night in Berlin, Cullen defeated Jonny Clayton 10-4 in the semi-finals to secure a place in the final against Michael van Gerwen, which he lost 11-10 after missing a match dart.

Cullen made it to the last 16 of the 2023 PDC World Darts Championship. He was knocked out by eventual winner Michael Smith.

World Championship record

PDC
 2011: First round (lost to Terry Jenkins 2–3)
 2012: First round (lost to Terry Jenkins 0–3)
 2013: First round (lost to John Part 0–3)
 2014: First round (lost to Peter Wright 0–3)
 2015: First round (lost to Michael van Gerwen 1–3)
 2016: First round (lost to Jelle Klaasen 0–3)
 2017: Second round (lost to Adrian Lewis 0–4)
 2018: First round (lost to Jermaine Wattimena 2–3)
 2019: Second round (lost to Brendan Dolan 0–3)
 2020: Second round (lost to Nico Kurz 1–3)
 2021: Fourth round (lost to Michael van Gerwen 3–4)
 2022: Third round (lost to Martijn Kleermaker 3–4)
 2023: Fourth round (lost to Michael Smith 1–4)

Career finals

PDC major finals: 2 (1 title, 1 runner-up)

Performance timeline

PDC European Tour

References

External links
Joe Cullen's official website

1989 births
Living people
English darts players
Professional Darts Corporation current tour card holders
Sportspeople from Bradford
PDC ranking title winners
Masters (darts) champions